The Mystery of Choice is a collection of short stories by American writer Robert W. Chambers, published by D. Appleton in 1897.  Distinguished by an atmospheric use of natural scenery, the stories are mostly set in Brittany in France.  The macabre and eerie feature throughout.  The last story was later incorporated into the episodic novel In Search of the Unknown.  The first edition omitted the title of "The Key to Grief" in its contents list.

Contents
 "The Purple Emperor"
 "Pompe Funebre"
 "The Messenger"
 "The White Shadow"
 "Passeur"
 "The Key to Grief"
 "A Matter of Interest"
"Envoy (a poem)"

External links
 The Mystery of Choice at Project Gutenberg
 

1897 short story collections
American short story collections
D. Appleton & Company books